Harmonicon may refer to:

Music 
 The Harmonicon, a London musical magazine 1823–33
 Panharmonicon, an organ-like musical instrument
 Harmonica, a handheld wind instrument
 A small pipe organ with a true keyed Glass harmonica, created by 
 A large strung keyboard instrument blending a piano and a harpsichord, played vis-a-vis (and such called) by two players
 Xylophone, a wooden percussion instrument

Other 
 Harmonicon (spider), a genus in the spider family Dipluridae
Harmoniconus, a subgenus of sea snails

See also
Harmonic (disambiguation)